

Ca 

 Charles Caccia b. 1930 first elected in 1968 as Liberal member for Davenport, Ontario.
 Bert Cadieu b. 1903 first elected in 1958 as Progressive Conservative member for Meadow Lake, Saskatchewan.
 Léo Alphonse Joseph Cadieux b. 1908 first elected in 1962 as Liberal member for Terrebonne, Quebec.
 Pierre H. Cadieux b. 1948 first elected in 1984 as Progressive Conservative member for Vaudreuil, Quebec.
 Chuck Cadman b. 1948 first elected in 1997 as Reform member for Surrey North, British Columbia.
 Dona Cadman b. 1950 first elected in 2008 as Conservative member for Surrey North, British Columbia. 
 Celina Caesar-Chavannes b. 1974 first elected in 2015 as Liberal member for Whitby, Ontario. 
 Norman Cafik b. 1928 first elected in 1968 as Liberal member for Ontario, Ontario.
 Charles Hazlitt Cahan b. 1861 first elected in 1925 as Conservative member for St. Lawrence—St. George, Quebec.
 Frank S. Cahill b. 1876 first elected in 1917 as Laurier Liberal member for Pontiac, Quebec.
 Paul Calandra b. 1970 first elected in 2008 as Conservative member for Oak Ridges—Markham, Ontario. 
 James Alexander Calder b. 1868 first elected in 1917 as Unionist member for Moose Jaw, Saskatchewan.
 Murray Calder b. 1951 first elected in 1993 as Liberal member for Wellington—Grey—Dufferin—Simcoe, Ontario.
 James Eber Caldwell b. 1943 first elected in 1984 as Progressive Conservative member for Essex—Kent, Ontario.
 Thomas Boyd Caldwell b. 1856 first elected in 1904 as Liberal member for Lanark North, Ontario.
 Thomas Wakem Caldwell b. 1867 first elected in 1919 as United Farmers member for Victoria—Carleton, New Brunswick.
 William Murray Caldwell b. 1832 first elected in 1868 as Liberal member for Restigouche, New Brunswick.
 Blaine Calkins b. 1968 first elected in 2006 as Conservative member for Wetaskiwin, Alberta.
 Catherine Callbeck b. 1939 first elected in 1988 as Liberal member for Malpeque, Prince Edward Island.
 William Samuel Calvert b. 1859 first elected in 1896 as Liberal member for Middlesex West, Ontario.
 Hiram Augustus Calvin b. 1851 first elected in 1892 as Independent Conservative member for Frontenac, Ontario.
 Pat Cameron b. 1895 first elected in 1949 as Liberal member for High Park, Ontario.
 Colin Cameron  b. 1896 first elected in 1953 as CCF member for Nanaimo, British Columbia.
 Daniel Alexander Cameron b. 1870 first elected in 1935 as Liberal member for Cape Breton North and Victoria, Nova Scotia.
 Donald Mackenzie Cameron b. 1843 first elected in 1883 as Liberal member for Middlesex West, Ontario.
 Donald Niel Cameron b. 1917 first elected in 1979 as Progressive Conservative member for Kamloops—Shuswap, British Columbia.
 Hector Cameron b. 1832 first elected in 1875 as Conservative member for Victoria North, Ontario.
 Hugh Cameron b. 1836 first elected in 1867 as Anti-Confederate member for Inverness, Nova Scotia.
 John Charles Alexander Cameron b. 1891 first elected in 1935 as Liberal member for Hastings South, Ontario.
 John Hillyard Cameron b. 1817 first elected in 1867 as Conservative member for Peel, Ontario.
 Malcolm Cameron b. 1808 first elected in 1874 as Liberal member for Ontario South, Ontario.
 Malcolm Colin Cameron b. 1832 first elected in 1867 as Liberal member for Huron South, Ontario.
 Iona Campagnolo b. 1932 first elected in 1974 as Liberal member for Skeena, British Columbia.
 A. Kim Campbell b. 1947 first elected in 1988 as Progressive Conservative member for Vancouver Centre, British Columbia.
 Alexander Maxwell Campbell b. 1888  first elected in 1945 as CCF member for The Battlefords, Saskatchewan.
 Archibald Campbell b. 1845 first elected in 1887 as Liberal member for Kent, Ontario.
 Barry R. Campbell b. 1950 first elected in 1993 as Liberal member for St. Paul's, Ontario.
 Charles James Campbell b. 1819 first elected in 1874 as Conservative member for Victoria, Nova Scotia.
 Colin Alexander Campbell b. 1901 first elected in 1934 as Liberal member for Frontenac—Addington, Ontario.
 Coline M. Campbell b. 1940 first elected in 1974 as Liberal member for South Western Nova, Nova Scotia.
 Ernest John Campbell b. 1903 first elected in 1957 as Progressive Conservative member for Lambton—Kent, Ontario.
 Glenlyon Campbell b. 1863 first elected in 1908 as Conservative member for Dauphin, Manitoba.
 Grant Campbell b. 1922 first elected in 1958 as Progressive Conservative member for Stormont, Ontario.
 John Campbell b. 1849 first elected in 1887 as Conservative member for Digby, Nova Scotia.
 John Campbell b. 1936 first elected in 1972 as Liberal member for Lasalle, Quebec.
 John Archibald Campbell b. 1872 first elected in 1917 as Unionist member for Nelson, Manitoba.
 Milton Neil Campbell b. 1881 first elected in 1921 as Progressive member for Mackenzie, Saskatchewan.
 Robert Campbell b. 1818 first elected in 1882 as Liberal member for Renfrew South, Ontario.
 Stewart Campbell b. 1812 first elected in 1867 as Anti-Confederate member for Guysborough, Nova Scotia.
 W. Bennett Campbell b. 1943 first elected in 1981 as Liberal member for Cardigan, Prince Edward Island.
 William Campbell first elected in 1979 as Progressive Conservative member for Sarnia, Ontario.
 Charles-Édouard Campeau b. 1916   first elected in 1958 as Progressive Conservative member for Saint-Jacques, Quebec.
 Ralph Osborne Campney b. 1894 first elected in 1949 as Liberal member for Vancouver Centre, British Columbia.
 Ron Cannan b. 1961 first elected in 2006 as Conservative member for Kelowna—Lake Country, British Columbia. 
 Richard Cannings b. 1954 as New Democratic Party member for South Okanagan—West Kootenay, British Columbia.
 John Cannis b. 1951 first elected in 1993 as Liberal member for Scarborough Centre, Ontario.
 Charles-Arthur Dumoulin Cannon b. 1905 first elected in 1949 as Liberal member for Îles-de-la-Madeleine, Quebec.
 Lawrence Cannon b. 1947 first elected in 2006 as Conservative member for Pontiac, Quebec.
 Lucien Cannon b. 1887 first elected in 1917 as Laurier Liberal member for Dorchester, Quebec.
 Reg Cantelon b. 1902 first elected in 1963 as Progressive Conservative member for Kindersley, Saskatchewan.
 Jean-Charles Cantin b. 1918 first elected in 1962 as Liberal member for Quebec South, Quebec.
 Thomas Cantley b. 1857 first elected in 1925 as Conservative member for Pictou, Nova Scotia.
 René Canuel b. 1936 first elected in 1993 as Bloc Québécois member for Matapédia—Matane, Quebec.
 Armand Caouette b. 1945 first elected in 1974 as Social Credit member for Villeneuve, Quebec.
 David Réal Caouette b. 1917 first elected in 1946 as Social Credit member for Pontiac, Quebec.
 Gilles Caouette b. 1940 first elected in 1972 as Social Credit member for Charlevoix, Quebec.
 Elinor Caplan b. 1944 first elected in 1997 as Liberal member for Thornhill, Ontario.
 Frak Caputo first elected in 2021 as Conservative member for Kamloops—Thompson—Cariboo, British Columbia.
 Onésiphore Carbonneau b. 1852 first elected in 1902 as Liberal member for L'Islet, Quebec.
 Lewis Elston Cardiff b. 1889   first elected in 1940 as National Government member for Huron North, Ontario.
 Murray Cardiff b. 1934   first elected in 1980 as Progressive Conservative member for Huron—Bruce, Ontario.
 Louis-Joseph-Lucien Cardin b. 1919   first elected in 1952 as Liberal member for Richelieu—Verchères, Quebec.
 Arthur Cardin b. 1879   first elected in 1911 as Liberal member for Richelieu, Quebec.
 Serge Cardin b. 1950   first elected in 1998 as Bloc Québécois member for Sherbrooke, Quebec.
 Henry Cargill b. 1838 first elected in 1887 as Conservative member for Bruce East, Ontario.
 Jean Guy Carignan b. 1941   first elected in 2000 as Liberal member for Québec East, Quebec.
 Onésime Carignan b. 1839 first elected in 1891 as Conservative member for Champlain, Quebec.
 John Carling b. 1828 first elected in 1867 as Liberal-Conservative member for London, Ontario.
 Archibald M. Carmichael b. 1882   first elected in 1921 as Progressive member for Kindersley, Saskatchewan.
 James William Carmichael b. 1819 first elected in 1867 as Anti-Confederate member for Pictou, Nova Scotia.
 John Carmichael b. 1952 first elected in 2011 as Conservative member for Don Valley West, Ontario. 
 Michael Carney b. 1839 first elected in 1904 as Liberal member for Halifax, Nova Scotia.
 Patricia Carney b. 1935   first elected in 1980 as Progressive Conservative member for Vancouver Centre, British Columbia.
 Alexis Pierre Caron b. 1899   first elected in 1953 as Liberal member for Hull, Quebec.
 André Caron b. 1944   first elected in 1993 as Bloc Québécois member for Jonquière, Quebec.
 George Caron b. 1823 first elected in 1867 as Conservative member for Maskinongé, Quebec.
 Guy Caron b. 1968 first elected in 2011 as New Democratic Party member for Rimouski-Neigette—Témiscouata—Les Basques, Quebec.
 Jean-Baptiste Thomas Caron b. 1869 first elected in 1907 as Liberal member for Ottawa (City of), Ontario.
 Joseph Philippe René Adolphe Caron b. 1843 first elected in 1873 as Conservative member for Quebec County, Quebec.
 Pierre Caron b. 1936   first elected in 1967 as Liberal member for Hull, Quebec.
 Yves Caron b. 1937   first elected in 1972 as Liberal member for Beauce, Quebec.
 Franklin Metcalfe Carpenter b. 1847 first elected in 1887 as Conservative member for Wentworth South, Ontario.
 Gary Carr b. 1955   first elected in 2004 as Liberal member for Halton, Ontario.
 Jim Carr b. 1951 first elected in 2015 as Liberal member for Winnipeg South Centre, Manitoba. 
 Donald Carrick b. 1906   first elected in 1954 as Liberal member for Trinity, Ontario.
 John James Carrick b. 1873 first elected in 1911 as Conservative member for Thunder Bay and Rainy River, Ontario.
 Colin Carrie b. 1962   first elected in 2004 as Conservative member for Oshawa, Ontario.
 Louis Auguste Carrier b. 1858 first elected in 1905 as Liberal member for Lévis, Quebec.
 Robert Carrier b. 1941   first elected in 2004 as Bloc Québécois member for Alfred-Pellan, Quebec.
 Henry George Carroll b. 1865 first elected in 1891 as Liberal member for Kamouraska, Quebec.
 M. Aileen Carroll b. 1944   first elected in 1997 as Liberal member for Barrie—Simcoe—Bradford, Ontario.
 William F. Carroll b. 1877 first elected in 1911 as Liberal member for Cape Breton South, Nova Scotia.
 John Carruthers b. 1863 first elected in 1921 as Liberal member for Algoma East, Ontario.
 Alexander Augustus Williamson Carscallen b. 1844 first elected in 1892 as Conservative member for Hastings North, Ontario.
 Chesley William Carter b. 1902 first elected in 1949 as Liberal member for Burin—Burgeo, Newfoundland and Labrador.
 Edward Carter b. 1822 first elected in 1871 as Conservative member for Brome, Quebec.
 Walter C. Carter b. 1929 first elected in 1968 as Progressive Conservative member for St. John's West, Newfoundland and Labrador.
 George-Étienne Cartier b. 1814 first elected in 1867 as Liberal-Conservative member for Montreal East, Quebec.
 Richard John Cartwright b. 1835 first elected in 1867 as Conservative member for Lennox, Ontario.
 Frank Broadstreet Carvell b. 1862 first elected in 1904 as Liberal member for Carleton, New Brunswick.
 Louis Napoléon Casault b. 1823 first elected in 1867 as Conservative member for Bellechasse, Quebec.
 Wilfrid Garfield Case b. 1898 first elected in 1945 as Progressive Conservative member for Grey North, Ontario.
 George Elliott Casey b. 1850 first elected in 1872 as Liberal member for Elgin West, Ontario.
 Sean Casey b. 1963 first elected in 2011 as Liberal member for Charlottetown, Prince Edward Island. 
 William D. Casey b. 1945 first elected in 1988 as Progressive Conservative member for Cumberland—Colchester, Nova Scotia.
 Philippe Baby Casgrain b. 1826 first elected in 1872 as Liberal member for L'Islet, Quebec.
 Pierre-François Casgrain b. 1886 first elected in 1917 as Laurier Liberal member for Charlevoix—Montmorency, Quebec.
 Thomas Chase Casgrain b. 1852 first elected in 1896 as Conservative member for Montmorency, Quebec.
 Andrew Cash b. 1962 first elected in 2011 as New Democratic Party member for Davenport, Ontario.
 Edward L. Cash b. 1849 first elected in 1904 as Liberal member for Mackenzie, Northwest Territories.
 Richard Joseph Cashin b. 1937 first elected in 1962 as Liberal member for St. John's West, Newfoundland and Labrador.
 Arza Clair Casselman b. 1891 first elected in 1921 as Conservative member for Grenville, Ontario.
 Cora Taylor Casselman b. 1888 first elected in 1941 as Liberal member for Edmonton East, Alberta.
 Frederick Clayton Casselman b. 1885 first elected in 1940 as Liberal member for Edmonton East, Alberta.
 Orren D. Casselman b. 1862 first elected in 1917 as Unionist member for Dundas, Ontario.
 Michael Cassidy b. 1937 first elected in 1984 as New Democratic Party member for Ottawa Centre, Ontario.
 Rick Casson b. 1948 first elected in 1997 as Reform member for Lethbridge, Alberta.
 George Hugh Castleden b. 1895 first elected in 1940 as CCF member for Yorkton, Saskatchewan.
 Douglas Marmaduke Caston b. 1917 first elected in 1967 as Progressive Conservative member for Jasper—Edson, Alberta.
 Jeannot Castonguay b. 1944 first elected in 2000 as Liberal member for Madawaska—Restigouche, New Brunswick.
 Cecil A. Cathers b. 1901 first elected in 1957 as Progressive Conservative member for York North, Ontario.
 A. Earl Catherwood b. 1900 first elected in 1949 as Progressive Conservative member for Haldimand, Ontario.
 Marlene Catterall b. 1939 first elected in 1988 as Liberal member for Ottawa West, Ontario.
 Médéric Catudal b. 1856 first elected in 1882 as Liberal member for Napierville, Quebec.
 Joseph-Édouard Cauchon b. 1816 first elected in 1867 as Conservative member for Montmorency, Quebec.
 Martin Cauchon b. 1962 first elected in 1993 as Liberal member for Outremont, Quebec.
 Robert Cauchon b. 1900 first elected in 1949 as Liberal member for Beauharnois, Quebec.
 Harry Peter Cavers b. 1909 first elected in 1949 as Liberal member for Lincoln, Ontario.
 Michael Cayley b. 1842 first elected in 1867 as Conservative member for Beauharnois, Quebec.
 Thomas Merritt Cayley b. 1878 first elected in 1926 as Liberal member for Oxford South, Ontario.

Ch 

 Benoît Chabot b. 1911 first elected in 1957 as Independent member for Kamouraska, Quebec.
 John Léo Chabot b. 1869 first elected in 1911 as Conservative member for Ottawa (City of), Ontario.
 Louise Chabot first elected in 2019 as Bloc Québécois member for Thérèse-De Blainville, Quebec.
 Harry Chadwick b. 1930 first elected in 1988 as Progressive Conservative member for Brampton—Malton, Ontario.
 Bardish Chagger b. 1980 first elected in 2015 as Liberal member for Waterloo, Ontario.
 George Chahal first elected in 2021 as Liberal member for Calgary Skyview, Alberta.
 Brenda Kay Chamberlain b. 1952 first elected in 1993 as Liberal member for Guelph—Wellington, Ontario.
 Brown Chamberlin b. 1827 first elected in 1867 as Conservative member for Missisquoi, Quebec.
 Adam Chambers first elected in 2021 as Conservative member for Simcoe North, Ontario.  
 Alan Chambers b. 1904 first elected in 1940 as Liberal member for Nanaimo, British Columbia.
 Egan Chambers b. 1921 first elected in 1958 as Progressive Conservative member for St. Lawrence—St. George, Quebec.
 Albert Champagne b. 1866 first elected in 1908 as Liberal member for Battleford, Saskatchewan.
 Andrée P. Champagne b. 1939 first elected in 1984 as Progressive Conservative member for Saint-Hyacinthe—Bagot, Quebec.
 François-Philippe Champagne b. 1970 first elected in 2015 as Liberal member for Saint-Maurice—Champlain, Quebec.
 Louis Napoléon Champagne b. 1860 first elected in 1897 as Liberal member for Wright, Quebec.
 Michel Champagne b. 1956 first elected in 1984 as Progressive Conservative member for Champlain, Quebec.
 Martin Champoux b. 1968 first elected in 2019 as Bloc Québécois member for Drummond, Quebec.
 Arnold Chan b. 1967 first elected in 2014 as Liberal member for Scarborough—Agincourt, Ontario. 
 Raymond Chan b. 1951 first elected in 1993 as Liberal member for Richmond, British Columbia.
 Edmund Leavens Chandler b. 1829 first elected in 1878 as Liberal member for Brome, Quebec.
 Gérard Chapdelaine b. 1935   first elected in 1962 as Social Credit member for Sherbrooke, Quebec.
 Renaud Chapdelaine b. 1911   first elected in 1949 as Progressive Conservative member for Nicolet—Yamaska, Quebec.
 Joseph-Adolphe Chapleau b. 1840 first elected in 1882 as Conservative member for Terrebonne, Quebec.
 Alexander Dew Chaplin b. 1872 first elected in 1925 as Conservative member for Kent, Ontario.
 Gordon Chaplin b. 1907   first elected in 1962 as Progressive Conservative member for Waterloo South, Ontario.
 James Dew Chaplin b. 1863 first elected in 1917 as Unionist member for Lincoln, Ontario.
 Hyliard G. Chappell b. 1916   first elected in 1968 as Liberal member for Peel South, Ontario.
 Louise Charbonneau first elected in 2019 as Bloc Québécois member for Trois-Rivières, Quebec.
 Napoléon Charbonneau b. 1853 first elected in 1895 as Liberal member for Jacques Cartier, Quebec.
 Yvon Charbonneau b. 1940   first elected in 1997 as Liberal member for Anjou—Rivière-des-Prairies, Quebec.
 Jean Charest b. 1958   first elected in 1984 as Progressive Conservative member for Sherbrooke, Quebec.
 Chris Charlton b. 1963 first elected in 2006 as New Democratic Party member for Hamilton Mountain, Ontario. 
 John Charlton b. 1829 first elected in 1872 as Liberal member for Norfolk North, Ontario.
 John Alpheus Charlton b. 1907   first elected in 1945 as Progressive Conservative member for Brant, Ontario.
 William Andrew Charlton b. 1841 first elected in 1911 as Liberal member for Norfolk, Ontario.
 Samuel Charters b. 1863 first elected in 1917 as Unionist member for Peel, Ontario.
 Gilbert Chartrand b. 1954   first elected in 1984 as Progressive Conservative member for Verdun—Saint-Paul, Quebec.
 Sophie Chatel first elected in 2021 as Liberal member for Pontiac, Quebec.
 David Chatters b. 1946   first elected in 1993 as Reform member for Athabasca, Alberta.
 George Louis Chatterton b. 1916   first elected in 1961 as Progressive Conservative member for Esquimalt—Saanich, British Columbia.
 Andrew Chatwood b. 1932   first elected in 1966 as Liberal member for Grand Falls—White Bay—Labrador, Newfoundland and Labrador.
 Pierre-Joseph-Olivier Chauveau b. 1820 first elected in 1867 as Conservative member for Quebec County, Quebec.
 Léon Adolphe Chauvin b. 1861 first elected in 1896 as Conservative member for Terrebonne, Quebec.
 Shaun Chen b. 1980 first elected in 2015 as Liberal member for Scarborough North, Ontario.
 Ray Chénier b. 1935   first elected in 1979 as Liberal member for Timmins—Chapleau, Ontario.
 John A. Chesley b. 1837 first elected in 1892 as Conservative member for City and County of St. John, New Brunswick.
 Guillaume Cheval dit St-Jacques b. 1828 first elected in 1867 as Liberal member for Rouville, Quebec.
 Edgar-Rodolphe-Eugène Chevrier b. 1887   first elected in 1921 as Liberal member for Ottawa (City of), Ontario.
 Lionel Chevrier b. 1903   first elected in 1935 as Liberal member for Stormont, Ontario.
 Thomas Edward Manley Chew b. 1874 first elected in 1908 as Liberal member for Simcoe East, Ontario.
 Paul Chiang first elected in 2021 as Liberal member for Markham—Unionville, Ontario.
 Sylvain Chicoine b. 1970 first elected in 2011 as New Democratic Party member for Châteauguay—Saint-Constant, Quebec. 
 Leverett de Veber Chipman b. 1831 first elected in 1870 as Liberal member for Kings, Nova Scotia.
 William Henry Chipman b. 1807 first elected in 1867 as Anti-Confederate member for Kings, Nova Scotia.
 Alexander William Chisholm b. 1869 first elected in 1908 as Liberal member for Inverness, Nova Scotia.
 Daniel Black Chisholm b. 1842 first elected in 1872 as Liberal-Conservative member for Hamilton, Ontario.
 Donald Chisholm b. 1822 first elected in 1887 as Conservative member for New Westminster, British Columbia.
 Robert Chisholm b. 1957 as New Democrat member for Dartmouth—Cole Harbour, Nova Scotia
 Thomas Chisholm b. 1842 first elected in 1904 as Conservative member for Huron East, Ontario.
 William Chisholm b. 1870 first elected in 1905 as Liberal member for Antigonish, Nova Scotia.
 Corneliu Chisu b. 1949 first elected in 2011 as Conservative member for Pickering—Scarborough East, Ontario. 
 Kenny Chiu first elected in 2019 as Conservative member for Steveston—Richmond East, British Columbia.
 Michael Chong b. 1971 first elected in 2004 as Conservative member for Wellington—Halton Hills, Ontario.
 Auguste Choquette b. 1932   first elected in 1963 as Liberal member for Lotbinière, Quebec.
 François Choquette b. 1974 first elected in 2011 as New Democratic Party member for Drummond, Quebec. 
 Joseph Armand Choquette b. 1905   first elected in 1943 as Bloc populaire canadien member for Stanstead, Quebec.
 Philippe-Auguste Choquette b. 1854 first elected in 1887 as Liberal member for Montmagny, Quebec.
 Honoré Julien Jean-Baptiste Chouinard b. 1850 first elected in 1888 as Conservative member for Dorchester, Quebec.
 Olivia Chow b. 1957 first elected in 2006 as New Democratic Party member for Trinity—Spadina, Ontario. 
 Gordon Chown b. 1922   first elected in 1957 as Progressive Conservative member for Winnipeg South, Manitoba.
 Jean Chrétien b. 1934   first elected in 1963 as Liberal member for Saint-Maurice—Laflèche, Quebec.
 Jean-Guy Chrétien b. 1946   first elected in 1993 as Bloc Québécois member for Frontenac, Quebec.
 Frank Claus Christian b. 1911   first elected in 1957 as Social Credit member for Okanagan Boundary, British Columbia.
 Peter Christie b. 1846 first elected in 1904 as Conservative member for Ontario South, Ontario.
 Thomas Christie b. 1824 first elected in 1875 as Liberal member for Argenteuil, Quebec.
 Thomas Christie, Jr. b. 1855 first elected in 1902 as Liberal member for Argenteuil, Quebec.
 David Christopherson b. 1954   first elected in 2004 as New Democratic Party member for Hamilton Centre, Ontario.
 Charles Edward Church b. 1835 first elected in 1872 as Liberal member for Lunenburg, Nova Scotia.
 Thomas Langton Church b. 1870 first elected in 1921 as Conservative member for Toronto North, Ontario.
 Gordon Minto Churchill b. 1898   first elected in 1951 as Progressive Conservative member for Winnipeg South Centre, Manitoba.

Ci 

 Marie Honorius Ernest Cimon b. 1849 first elected in 1874 as Conservative member for Chicoutimi—Saguenay, Quebec.
 Simon Cimon b. 1852 first elected in 1887 as Conservative member for Charlevoix, Quebec.
 Simon Xavier Cimon b. 1829 first elected in 1867 as Conservative member for Charlevoix, Quebec.

Cl 

 Gordon Drummond Clancy b. 1912   first elected in 1958 as Progressive Conservative member for Yorkton, Saskatchewan.
 James Clancy b. 1844 first elected in 1896 as Conservative member for Bothwell, Ontario.
 Mary Catherine Clancy b. 1948   first elected in 1988 as Liberal member for Halifax, Nova Scotia.
 George Adam Clare b. 1854 first elected in 1900 as Conservative member for Waterloo South, Ontario.
 Charles Joseph Clark b. 1939   first elected in 1972 as Progressive Conservative member for Rocky Mountain, Alberta.
 Hugh Clark b. 1867 first elected in 1911 as Conservative member for Bruce North, Ontario.
 John Clark b. 1835 first elected in 1896 as Liberal member for Grey North, Ontario.
 John Arthur Clark b. 1886   first elected in 1921 as Conservative member for Burrard, British Columbia.
 Michael Clark b. 1861 first elected in 1908 as Liberal member for Red Deer, Alberta.
 Stuart Murray Clark b. 1899   first elected in 1935 as Liberal member for Essex South, Ontario.
 Walter Leland Rutherford Clark b. 1936   first elected in 1983 as Progressive Conservative member for Brandon—Souris, Manitoba.
 William George Clark b. 1865 first elected in 1935 as Liberal member for York—Sunbury, New Brunswick.
 Alfred Henry Clarke b. 1860 first elected in 1904 as Liberal member for Essex South, Ontario.
 Alupa Clarke b. 1986 first elected in 2015 as Conservative member for Beauport—Limoilou, Quebec.
 Edward Frederick Clarke b. 1850 first elected in 1896 as Conservative member for West Toronto, Ontario.
 Harry Gladstone Clarke b. 1881   first elected in 1935 as Conservative member for Rosedale, Ontario.
 Rob Clarke b. 1967 first elected in 2008 as Conservative member for Desnethé—Missinippi—Churchill River, Saskatchewan. 
 William Aurelius Clarke b. 1868 first elected in 1911 as Conservative member for Wellington North, Ontario.
 William Hillary Clarke b. 1933   first elected in 1972 as Progressive Conservative member for Vancouver Quadra, British Columbia.
 Roger Clavet b. 1953   first elected in 2004 as Bloc Québécois member for Louis-Hébert, Quebec.
 Brooke Claxton b. 1898   first elected in 1940 as Liberal member for St. Lawrence—St. George, Quebec.
 George Clayes b. 1831 first elected in 1887 as Liberal member for Missisquoi, Quebec.
 Bernard Cleary b. 1937   first elected in 2004 as Bloc Québécois member for Louis-Saint-Laurent, Quebec.
 Ryan Cleary b. 1966 first elected in 2011 as New Democratic member for St. John's South—Mount Pearl, Newfoundland and Labrador. 
 Hughes Cleaver b. 1892   first elected in 1935 as Liberal member for Halton, Ontario.
 Tony Clement b. 1961 first elected in 2006 as Conservative member for Parry Sound—Muskoka, Ontario. 
 Herbert Sylvester Clements b. 1865 first elected in 1904 as Conservative member for Kent West, Ontario.
 Gaston Clermont b. 1913   first elected in 1960 as Liberal member for Labelle, Quebec.
 Clarence Chester Cleveland b. 1849 first elected in 1891 as Conservative member for Richmond—Wolfe, Quebec.
 Lawson Omar Clifford b. 1878   first elected in 1921 as Liberal member for Ontario South, Ontario.
 Terrence Clifford b. 1938   first elected in 1984 as Progressive Conservative member for London—Middlesex, Ontario.
 J. Roger Clinch b. 1947   first elected in 1984 as Progressive Conservative member for Gloucester, New Brunswick.
 Hector Daniel Clouthier b. 1949   first elected in 1997 as Liberal member for Renfrew—Nipissing—Pembroke, Ontario.
 Armand Cloutier b. 1901   first elected in 1940 as Liberal member for Drummond—Arthabaska, Quebec.
 Sidney LeRoi Clunis b. 1911   first elected in 1962 as Liberal member for Kent, Ontario.
 William Cluxton b. 1819 first elected in 1872 as Conservative member for Peterborough West, Ontario.

Co 
 Siobhán Coady first elected in 2008 as Liberal member for St. John's South—Mount Pearl, Newfoundland and Labrador.
 Robert Carman Coates b. 1928   first elected in 1957 as Progressive Conservative member for Cumberland, Nova Scotia.
 Emerson Coatsworth b. 1854 first elected in 1891 as Conservative member for Toronto East, Ontario.
 Gerald Richard Cobbe b. 1927   first elected in 1968 as Liberal member for Portage, Manitoba.
 Dennis H. Cochrane b. 1950   first elected in 1984 as Progressive Conservative member for Moncton, New Brunswick.
 Edward Cochrane b. 1834 first elected in 1882 as Conservative member for Northumberland East, Ontario.
 Francis Cochrane b. 1852 first elected in 1911 as Conservative member for Nipissing, Ontario.
 Kenneth Judson Cochrane b. 1896   first elected in 1935 as Liberal member for Cumberland, Nova Scotia.
 Alexander Peter Cockburn b. 1837 first elected in 1872 as Liberal member for Muskoka, Ontario.
 George Ralph Richardson Cockburn b. 1834 first elected in 1887 as Conservative member for Toronto Centre, Ontario.
 James Cockburn b. 1819 first elected in 1867 as Conservative member for Northumberland West, Ontario.
 Alan Cockeram b. 1894   first elected in 1940 as National Government member for York South, Ontario.
 William Foster Cockshutt b. 1855 first elected in 1904 as Conservative member for Brantford, Ontario.
 Desmond Code b. 1912   first elected in 1965 as Progressive Conservative member for Lanark, Ontario.
 Denis Coderre b. 1963   first elected in 1997 as Liberal member for Bourassa, Quebec.
 Louis Coderre b. 1865 first elected in 1911 as Conservative member for Hochelaga, Quebec.
 Thomas Coffin b. 1817 first elected in 1867 as Anti-Confederate member for Shelburne, Nova Scotia.
 Elizabeth Shaughnessy Cohen b. 1948 first elected in 1993 as Liberal member for Windsor—St. Clair, Ontario.
 Charles Carroll Colby b. 1827 first elected in 1867 as Liberal-Conservative member for Stanstead, Quebec.
 Major James William Coldwell b. 1888 first elected in 1935 as CCF member for Rosetown—Biggar, Saskatchewan.
 John Cole b. 1942   first elected in 1988 as Progressive Conservative member for York—Simcoe, Ontario.
 David Michael Collenette b. 1946 first elected in 1974 as Liberal member for York East, Ontario.
 A.B. Collins b. 1935 first elected in 1993 as Liberal member for Souris—Moose Mountain, Saskatchewan.
 Chad Collins first elected in 2021 as Liberal member for Hamilton East—Stoney Creek, Ontario. 
 Laurel Collins b. 1984 first elected in 2019 as New Democratic Party member for Victoria, British Columbia. 
 Mary Collins b. 1940 first elected in 1984 as Progressive Conservative member for Capilano, British Columbia.
 Charles Wesley Colter b. 1846 first elected in 1886 as Liberal member for Haldimand, Ontario.
 Newton Ramsay Colter b. 1844 first elected in 1891 as Liberal member for Carleton, New Brunswick.
 Joe Comartin b. 1947 first elected in 2000 as New Democratic Party member for Windsor—St. Clair, Ontario.
 Gerald J. Comeau b. 1946   first elected in 1984 as Progressive Conservative member for South West Nova, Nova Scotia.
 Louis-Roland Comeau b. 1941   first elected in 1968 as Progressive Conservative member for South Western Nova, Nova Scotia.
 William Henry Comstock b. 1830 first elected in 1899 as Liberal member for Brockville, Ontario.
 Joseph-Roland Comtois b. 1929   first elected in 1965 as Liberal member for Joliette—l'Assomption—Montcalm, Quebec.
 Paul Comtois b. 1895   first elected in 1957 as Progressive Conservative member for Nicolet—Yamaska, Quebec.
 Joseph R. Comuzzi b. 1933   first elected in 1988 as Liberal member for Thunder Bay—Nipigon, Ontario.
 Lionel Pretoria Conacher b. 1902   first elected in 1949 as Liberal member for Trinity, Ontario.
 Joseph Lawrence Condon b. 1936   first elected in 1974 as Liberal member for Middlesex—London—Lambton, Ontario.
 Frederick Tennyson Congdon b. 1858 first elected in 1908 as Liberal member for Yukon, Yukon.
 James Conmee b. 1848 first elected in 1904 as Liberal member for Thunder Bay and Rainy River, Ontario.
 Charles Connell b. 1810 first elected in 1867 as Liberal member for Carleton, New Brunswick.
 George Heber Connell b. 1836 first elected in 1878 as Independent member for Carleton, New Brunswick.
 Charles Henry Cook b. 1926   first elected in 1979 as Progressive Conservative member for North Vancouver—Burnaby, British Columbia.
 Herman Henry Cook b. 1837 first elected in 1872 as Liberal member for Simcoe North, Ontario.
 Jean-Paul Cook b. 1927   first elected in 1962 as Social Credit member for Montmagny—l'Islet, Quebec.
 Albert Glen Cooper b. 1952   first elected in 1980 as Progressive Conservative member for Peace River, Alberta.
 Clarence Owen Cooper b. 1899   first elected in 1958 as Progressive Conservative member for Rosetown—Biggar, Saskatchewan.
 George Thomas Jendery Cooper b. 1941   first elected in 1979 as Progressive Conservative member for Halifax, Nova Scotia.
 Michael Cooper b. 1984 first elected in 2015 as Conservative member for St. Albert—Edmonton, Alberta.
 Richard Clive Cooper b. 1881   first elected in 1917 as Unionist member for Vancouver South, British Columbia.
 George Gibson Coote b. 1880   first elected in 1921 as Progressive member for Macleod, Alberta.
 Albert James Smith Copp first elected in 1896 as Liberal member for Digby, Nova Scotia.
 Arthur Bliss Copp b. 1870 first elected in 1915 as Liberal member for Westmorland, New Brunswick.
 Sheila Maureen Copps b. 1952 first elected in 1984 as Liberal member for Hamilton East, Ontario.
 Jean Corbeil b. 1934   first elected in 1988 as Progressive Conservative member for Anjou—Rivière-des-Prairies, Quebec.
 Robert Alfred Corbett b. 1938   first elected in 1978 as Progressive Conservative member for Fundy—Royal, New Brunswick.
 Eymard Georges Corbin b. 1934   first elected in 1968 as Liberal member for Madawaska—Victoria, New Brunswick.
 Gordon Edward Corbould b. 1847 first elected in 1890 as Conservative member for New Westminster, British Columbia.
 Henry Corby b. 1851 first elected in 1888 as Conservative member for Hastings West, Ontario.
 Ellis Hopkins Corman b. 1894   first elected in 1940 as Liberal member for Wentworth, Ontario.
 Maxime Cormier b. 1878   first elected in 1930 as Conservative member for Restigouche—Madawaska, New Brunswick.
 Serge Cormier b. 1974 first elected in 2015 as Liberal member for Acadie—Bathurst, New Brunswick.
 Léopold Corriveau b. 1926   first elected in 1970 as Liberal member for Frontenac, Quebec.
 James Neilson Corry b. 1895   first elected in 1949 as Liberal member for Perth, Ontario.
 Paul James Cosgrove b. 1934   first elected in 1980 as Liberal member for York—Scarborough, Ontario.
 Jennifer Cossitt b. 1948   first elected in 1982 as Progressive Conservative member for Leeds—Grenville, Ontario.
 Thomas Charles Cossitt b. 1927   first elected in 1972 as Progressive Conservative member for Leeds, Ontario.
 John Costigan b. 1835 first elected in 1867 as Liberal-Conservative member for Victoria, New Brunswick.
 Alcide Côté b. 1903 first elected in 1945 as Liberal member for Saint-Jean—Iberville—Napierville, Quebec.
 Antoine-Philéas Côté b. 1903 first elected in 1945 as Independent Liberal member for Matapédia—Matane, Quebec.
 Clément M. Côté b. 1940 first elected in 1984 as Progressive Conservative member for Lac-Saint-Jean, Quebec.
 Eva Lachance Côté b. 1934   first elected in 1980 as Liberal member for Rimouski, Quebec.
 Florian Côté b. 1929 first elected in 1966 as Liberal member for Nicolet—Yamaska, Quebec.
 Gustave Côté b. 1913   first elected in 1965 as Liberal member for Dorchester, Quebec.
 Guy Côté b. 1965 first elected in 2004 as Bloc Québécois member for Portneuf, Quebec.
 Joseph Julien Jean-Pierre Côté b. 1926   first elected in 1963 as Liberal member for Longueuil, Quebec.
 Maurice Côté b. 1917   first elected in 1962 as Social Credit member for Chicoutimi, Quebec.
 Michel Côté b. 1942   first elected in 1984 as Progressive Conservative member for Langelier, Quebec.
 Paul-Émile Côté b. 1909   first elected in 1940 as Liberal member for Verdun, Quebec.
 Pierre-Émile Côté b. 1887   first elected in 1937 as Liberal member for Bonaventure, Quebec.
 Raymond Côté b. 1967 first elected in 2011 as New Democratic Party member for Beauport—Limoilou, Quebec. 
 Yvon Côté b. 1939   first elected in 1988 as Progressive Conservative member for Richmond—Wolfe, Quebec.
 Michael Coteau b. 1972 first elected in 2021 as Liberal member for Don Valley East, Ontario. 
 Irwin Cotler b. 1940   first elected in 1999 as Liberal member for Mount Royal, Quebec.
 Ira Delbert Cotnam b. 1883   first elected in 1925 as Conservative member for Renfrew North, Ontario.
 Timothy Coughlin b. 1834 first elected in 1878 as Liberal-Conservative member for Middlesex North, Ontario.
 Charles Jérémie Coulombe b. 1846 first elected in 1887 as Conservative member for Maskinongé, Quebec.
 Sixte Coupal dit la Reine b. 1825 first elected in 1867 as Liberal member for Napierville, Quebec.
 Gérard Cournoyer b. 1912   first elected in 1946 as Liberal member for Richelieu—Verchères, Quebec.
 Michel Charles Joseph Coursol b. 1819 first elected in 1878 as Conservative member for Montreal East, Quebec.
 Henri Courtemanche b. 1916   first elected in 1949 as Progressive Conservative member for Labelle, Quebec.
 René Cousineau b. 1930   first elected in 1979 as Liberal member for Gatineau, Quebec.
 Clément Couture b. 1939   first elected in 1988 as Progressive Conservative member for Saint-Jean, Quebec.
 Paul Couture b. 1833 first elected in 1887 as Independent member for Chicoutimi—Saguenay, Quebec.
 Donald James Cowan b. 1883   first elected in 1926 as Conservative member for Port Arthur—Thunder Bay, Ontario.
 George Henry Cowan b. 1858 first elected in 1908 as Conservative member for Vancouver City, British Columbia.
 Mahlon K. Cowan b. 1863 first elected in 1896 as Liberal member for Essex South, Ontario.
 Ralph Cowan b. 1902   first elected in 1962 as Liberal member for York—Humber, Ontario.
 Walter Davy Cowan b. 1865 first elected in 1917 as Unionist member for Regina, Saskatchewan.
 Marlene Cowling b. 1941   first elected in 1993 as Liberal member for Dauphin—Swan River, Manitoba.
 Charles Delmer Coyle b. 1887   first elected in 1945 as Progressive Conservative member for Elgin, Ontario.

Cr 

 Thomas Dixon Craig b. 1842 first elected in 1891 as Independent Conservative member for Durham East, Ontario.
 James Crawford b. 1816 first elected in 1867 as Conservative member for Brockville, Ontario.
 John Crawford b. 1856 first elected in 1904 as Liberal member for Portage la Prairie, Manitoba.
 John Willoughby Crawford b. 1817 first elected in 1867 as Conservative member for Leeds South, Ontario.
 Rex Crawford b. 1932   first elected in 1988 as Liberal member for Kent, Ontario.
 William Lawrence Marven Creaghan b. 1922   first elected in 1958 as Progressive Conservative member for Westmorland, New Brunswick.
 Thomas Alexander Crerar b. 1876   first elected in 1917 as Liberal member for Marquette, Manitoba.
 Leon David Crestohl b. 1900   first elected in 1950 as Liberal member for Cartier, Quebec.
 Joseph-Alphida Crête b. 1890   first elected in 1935 as Liberal member for St-Maurice—Laflèche, Quebec.
 Paul Crête b. 1953   first elected in 1993 as Bloc Québécois member for Kamouraska—Rivière-du-Loup, Quebec.
 Joan Crockatt b. 1955 first elected in 2012 as Conservative member for Calgary Centre, Alberta. 
 Oswald Smith Crocket b. 1868 first elected in 1904 as Conservative member for York, New Brunswick.
 Patrick Dermott Crofton b. 1935   first elected in 1984 as Progressive Conservative member for Esquimalt—Saanich, British Columbia.
 William Joseph Croke b. 1840 first elected in 1867 as Anti-Confederate member for Richmond, Nova Scotia.
 David Arnold Croll b. 1900   first elected in 1945 as Liberal member for Spadina, Ontario.
 Bonnie Crombie b. 1950 first elected in 2008 as Liberal member for Mississauga—Streetsville, Ontario.
 David Edward Crombie b. 1936   first elected in 1978 as Progressive Conservative member for Rosedale, Ontario.
 Frederick Robert Cromwell b. 1872 first elected in 1911 as Conservative member for Compton, Quebec.
 Hume Blake Cronyn b. 1864 first elected in 1917 as Unionist member for London, Ontario.
 John Carnell Crosbie b. 1931   first elected in 1976 as Progressive Conservative member for St. John's West, Newfoundland and Labrador.
 Adam Brown Crosby b. 1859 first elected in 1908 as Conservative member for Halifax, Nova Scotia.
 Howard Edward Crosby b. 1933   first elected in 1978 as Progressive Conservative member for Halifax—East Hants, Nova Scotia.
 Charles Wilson Cross b. 1872 first elected in 1925 as Liberal member for Athabaska, Alberta.
 Guy F. Crossman b. 1915   first elected in 1962 as Liberal member for Kent, New Brunswick.
 Thomas Wilson Crothers b. 1850 first elected in 1908 as Conservative member for Elgin West, Ontario.
 Lloyd Roseville Crouse b. 1918   first elected in 1957 as Progressive Conservative member for Queens—Lunenburg, Nova Scotia.
 Darius Crouter b. 1827 first elected in 1881 as Independent Liberal member for Northumberland East, Ontario.
 Jean Crowder b. 1952   first elected in 2004 as New Democratic Party member for Nanaimo—Cowichan, British Columbia.
 Sanford Johnston Crowe b. 1868 first elected in 1917 as Liberal member for Burrard, British Columbia.
 George Alexander Cruickshank (Canadian politician) b. 1897   first elected in 1940 as Liberal member for Fraser Valley, British Columbia.
 Robert Cruise b. 1868 first elected in 1911 as Liberal member for Dauphin, Manitoba.

Cu 

 Harold William Culbert b. 1944   first elected in 1993 as Liberal member for Carleton—Charlotte, New Brunswick.
 John Culbert b. 1847 first elected in 1900 as Conservative member for Brockville, Ontario.
 Jack Sydney George Cullen b. 1927   first elected in 1968 as Liberal member for Sarnia, Ontario.
 Nathan Cullen b. 1972 first elected in 2004 as New Democratic Party member for Skeena—Bulkley Valley, British Columbia.
 Roy Cullen b. 1944   first elected in 1996 as Liberal member for Etobicoke North, Ontario.
 Arthur Culligan b. 1879   first elected in 1925 as Conservative member for Restigouche—Madawaska, New Brunswick.
 Frederick William Cumberland b. 1821 first elected in 1871 as Conservative member for Algoma, Ontario.
 James Cumming b. 1961 first elected in 2019 as Conservative member for Edmonton Centre, Alberta. 
 John Martin Cummins b. 1942   first elected in 1993 as Reform member for Delta, British Columbia.
 James Cunningham b. 1834 first elected in 1874 as Liberal member for New Westminster, British Columbia.
 Robert Cunningham b. 1836 first elected in 1872 as Liberal member for Marquette, Manitoba.
 Douglas Cunnington b. 1885   first elected in 1939 as Conservative member for Calgary West, Alberta.
 John Joseph Curran b. 1842 first elected in 1882 as Conservative member for Montreal Centre, Quebec.
 John Allister Currie b. 1868 first elected in 1908 as Conservative member for Simcoe North, Ontario.
 Morley Currie b. 1869 first elected in 1908 as Liberal member for Prince Edward, Ontario.
 Joseph Merrill Currier b. 1820 first elected in 1867 as Liberal-Conservative member for Ottawa (City of), Ontario.
 Lemuel Cushing, Jr. b. 1842 first elected in 1874 as Liberal member for Argenteuil, Quebec.
 Edward Octavian Cuthbert b. 1826 first elected in 1875 as Conservative member for Berthier, Quebec.
 Robert Barry Cutler b. 1810 first elected in 1872 as Liberal member for Kent, New Brunswick.
 Rodger Cuzner b. 1955 first elected in 2000 as Liberal member for Bras d'Or—Cape Breton, Nova Scotia.

Cy 

 Alexandre Cyr b. 1922 first elected in 1963 as Liberal member for Gaspé, Quebec.
 Joseph Ernest Cyr b. 1854 first elected in 1904 as Liberal member for Provencher, Manitoba.

C